Metaxanthia vespiformis is a moth of the family Erebidae first described by Herbert Druce in 1899. It is found in Brazil, Peru, Colombia, Ecuador, French Guiana, Guyana and Costa Rica.

References

 

Phaegopterina
Moths described in 1899